Year 1225 (MCCXXV) was a common year starting on Wednesday (link will display the full calendar) of the Julian calendar.

Events 
 By place 

 Mongol Empire 
 Autumn – Subutai is assigned a new campaign by Genghis Khan against the Tanguts. He crosses the Gobi Desert with a Mongol army and advances south into the Western Xia (or Xi Xia). Meanwhile, Genghis, in his mid-sixties, becomes wounded during hunting. His injury – a dislocated shoulder, perhaps, or a bruised rib – forces him to take some rest. 
 Iltutmish, Ghurid ruler of the Delhi Sultanate, repels a Mongol attack and invades Bengal. His rival, Ghiyasuddin, leads an army to halt Iltutmish's advance, but decides to avoid a conflict by paying him tribute and accepting his suzerainty.

 Europe 
 July 25 – Emperor Frederick II takes an oath at San Germano (near Cassino) and promises to depart on a Crusade (the Sixth Crusade), for the Near East in August 1227. He sends 1000 knights to the Levant and provides Rome with 100,000 ounces of gold, to be forfeit to the Catholic Church should he break his vow. These funds will be returned to Frederick once he arrives at Acre.
 November 9 – Frederick II marries the 14-year-old Queen Yolande, heiress to the kingdom of Jerusalem, and adds the Crusader States to his dominions.
 November 29 – The 12-year-old Henry VII, by order of his father Frederick II, marries Margaret of Austria, daughter of Duke Leopold VI (the Glorious).
 The Teutonic Knights are expelled from Transylvania by King Andrew II, because they wanted to separate from Hungary.

 England 
 February 11 – The Charter of the Forest is restored to its traditional rights by King Henry III. 'Free men' are allowed to find pasture for their pigs, collect firewood, graze animals, or cut turf for fuel. At this time, however, only about 10 percent of the population is 'free', the rest are locked into service to a local landowner, some of them little more than slaves.
 The Magna Carta is reaffirmed (for the third time) by Henry III, in return for issuing a property tax. It becomes the definitive version of the text.

 Middle East 
 Summer – Battle of Garni: Khwarezmid forces led by Jalal al-Din Mangburni defeat the Georgian army (some 70,000 men) at Garni. The royal court of Queen Rusudan moves to Kutaisi, while the Georgian capital Tbilisi is besieged by the Khwarezmians.
 July 25 – Jalal al-Din Mangburni dethrones Muzaffar al-Din Uzbek, ruler (atabeg) of the Eldiguzids, and sets himself up in the capital of Tabriz (modern Iran).
 October 5 – Caliph Al-Nasir dies from dysentery at Baghdad after a 45-year reign. He is succeeded by his son Al-Zahir as ruler of the Abbasid Caliphate.

 Levant 
 The 8-year-old Henry I (the Fat) is crowned as king of Cyprus in the Cathedral of Saint Sophia at Nicosia. His uncle Philip of Ibelin orders the coronation, so that when Henry comes of age at fifteen a regency could not be prolonged on the ground that he is not yet crowned.

 Asia 
 December 31 – Lý Chiêu Hoàng, only empress regnant in the history of Vietnam, marries Trần Thái Tông, making him the first ruler of the Trần dynasty.

 By topic 

 Religion 
 May 10 – Gerold of Lausanne, French bishop of Valence, becomes the new Latin patriarch of Jerusalem (until 1239).
 July 27 – Visby Cathedral in Sweden is consecrated.

Births 
 Amato Ronconi, Italian nobleman and monk (d. 1292)
 Beatrice of Bohemia, German noblewoman (d. 1290)
 Beatrice of Brabant, countess of Flanders (d. 1288)
 Chabi, Mongol empress and wife of Kublai Khan (d. 1281) 
 David VI Narin (the Clever), king of Georgia (d. 1293)
 Franciscus Accursius, Italian lawyer and jurist (d. 1293)
 Fujiwara no Kitsushi, Japanese empress (d. 1292)
 Gaston VII (Froissard), viscount of Béarn (d. 1290)
 Guido Guinizelli, Italian poet and writer (d. 1276)
 Guigues VII, ruler (dauphin) of Viennois (d. 1269)
 Saionji Kisshi, Japanese empress consort (d. 1292)
 Sanchia of Provence, queen of Germany (d. 1261)
 Thomas Aquinas, Italian friar and theologian (d. 1274)
 Todros ben Joseph Abulafia, Spanish rabbi (d. 1285)
 Walter Giffard, English Lord Chancellor (d. 1279)

Deaths 
 January 3 – Adolf III of Holstein, German nobleman (b. 1160)
 February 18 – Hugh Bigod, English nobleman (b. 1182)
 March 30 – Gertrude of Dagsburg, French noblewoman
 May 6 – John of Fountains, English prelate and bishop 
 June 8 – Sabrisho IV, patriarch of the Church of the East
 June 21 – Conrad of Krosigk, German prelate and bishop 
 July 16 – Ōe no Hiromoto, Japanese nobleman (b. 1148)
 August 16 – Hōjō Masako, Japanese noblewoman (b. 1156)
 August 24 – Adelardo Cattaneo, Italian cardinal and bishop
 September 16 – Rainier of Antioch, Latin cleric and patriarch
 September 17 – William VI, marquis of Montferrat (b. 1173)
 September 29 – Arnaud Amalric, French abbot and bishop
 October 5 – Al-Nasir, caliph of the Abbasid Caliphate (b. 1158)
 October 28 – Jien, Japanese poet and historian (b. 1155)
 November 7 – Engelbert II of Berg, archbishop of Cologne
 Ahmad al-Buni, Almohad mathematician and Sufi writer
 Al-Afdal ibn Salah ad-Din, ruler of Damascus (b. 1169)
 Bernard Itier, French librarian and chronicler (b. 1163)
 Eliezer ben Joel HaLevi, German rabbi and writer (b. 1140)
 Geoffrey de Neville, English nobleman and seneschal
 Ghabdula Chelbir (or Chelbir), ruler of Volga Bulgaria
 Ivane of Akhaltsikhe, Georgian nobleman and courtier
 Lamberto Visconti di Eldizio, Sardinian ruler of Gallura
 Margaret of Louvain, Flemish servant and saint (b. 1207) 
 Muzaffar al-Din Uzbek, ruler (atabeg) of the Eldiguzids
 Urso of Calabria, Italian scholar, philosopher and writer
 William the Breton, French chronicler (approximate date)
 Zhao Hong, Chinese prince and heir apparent (b. 1207)

References